James Christopher "Ike" Caveney (December 10, 1894 – July 6, 1949) was a Major League Baseball shortstop who played for the Cincinnati Reds from  to .  He later became the player-manager for the San Francisco Seals of the Pacific Coast League from 1932 to 1934.

Early life

Caveney was raised in San Francisco. He was educated at Columbia Park Grammar School. There he began playing baseball and also was a member of the first Australian rules football ("Field Ball") team in America. Representing the United States in both baseball and Australian football on several occasions he toured Australia, New Zealand and Canada as a junior player in both sports. He was to go on to coach the touring junior baseball team and Australian rules football at several San Francisco schools.

Playing career 
Caveney began his playing career in 1914 and became the starting shortstop for the San Francisco Seals from 1918 to 1921.  In 1922, he was part of a new left side of the infield for the Cincinnati Reds.  His best season was 1923 when he had a .277 batting average and was one of the top defensive shortstops in the National League.   Injuries forced him to quit at the end of 1925.

In 1926, he returned to the Pacific Coast League playing for the Oakland Oaks for a partial season and a full season in 1927.  In 1928, he was traded to the San Francisco Seals where he played until 1934.

Managing career 
From 1932 to 1934, Caveney was the player-manager for the Seals.  Although the Seals won the PCL pennant in 1931 and 1935, they were beaten by the Los Angeles Angels in 1933 and 1934 for the title.

The most well-known aspect of his managing career is the early development of Joe DiMaggio's career.  Vince DiMaggio was signed by the team in 1932 and towards the end of the season Augie Galan, the starting shortstop, requested to be able to miss the final four games of the season to vacation in Hawaii.  The team would be left without a shortstop, so Vince suggested to Caveney that his little brother, playing semi-pro ball at the time, could fill in for a few games, and Caveney agreed.  Although he did not play great in the few games, he was invited to the Seals spring training the next season, when he made the opening day team.  Joe DiMaggio's defensive play at shortstop was plagued by errors, both fielding errors and overthrowing first base, which persisted into the regular season in 1933. Frustrated by play, Caveney moved Joe into the outfield in the fourth game of the season which became his position for the remainder of the season and his career.

Caveney was replaced after the 1934 season by Lefty O'Doul.

References

External links

1894 births
1949 deaths
Baseball players from San Francisco
Chattanooga Lookouts players
Cincinnati Reds players
Columbus Senators players
Major League Baseball shortstops
Oakland Oaks (baseball) players
Salt Lake City Skyscrapers players
San Francisco Seals (baseball) managers
San Francisco Seals (baseball) players
Seattle Indians players
Springfield Reapers players
Murray Infants players